Tessa Rose Ferrer (born March 30, 1986) is an American actress. She is known for playing Dr. Leah Murphy, a surgical intern then resident, in Grey's Anatomy.

She is the daughter of singer Debby Boone and Gabriel Ferrer.

Career
In 2012, Shonda Rhimes cast Ferrer in a recurring role as Dr. Leah Murphy in season nine of the ABC drama series Grey's Anatomy. In 2016, Ferrer returned to her role as Dr. Leah Murphy in episode six of season 13.

In 2014, Ferrer had a recurring role in the CBS series Extant. In 2015, she had recurring role in season two of the FXX comedy series, You're the Worst.

Filmography

Film

Television

References

External links
 

1986 births
21st-century American actresses
Actresses from Los Angeles
American film actresses
American television actresses
Boone family (show business)
Ferrer family (acting)
Living people